Matúš Hruška (born 17 September 1994) is a Slovak professional footballer who plays for Dukla Banská Bystrica.

Club career

He made his professional debut for Spartak Myjava against FK Senica on 20 March 2015. Hruška joined Dukla Prague from Myjava in January 2017. He moved to Banská Bystrica on 22 September 2020 and made his debut one day later keeping a clean sheet in 3-0 win against MŠK Púchov.

References

External links
 Spartak Myjava profile
 Fortuna Liga profile
 
 
 Eurofotbal profile
 Futbalnet profile

1994 births
Living people
Sportspeople from Žilina
Slovak footballers
Association football goalkeepers
MŠK Púchov players
Spartak Myjava players
FK Dukla Prague players
Slovak Super Liga players
Czech First League players
Czech National Football League players
Slovakia under-21 international footballers
Expatriate footballers in the Czech Republic
Slovak expatriate sportspeople in the Czech Republic
FK Dukla Banská Bystrica players
2. Liga (Slovakia) players